Miloslav Kolařík (born 20 April 1942) is a Czech weightlifter. He competed in the men's middleweight event at the 1968 Summer Olympics.

References

External links
 

1942 births
Living people
Czech male weightlifters
Olympic weightlifters of Czechoslovakia
Weightlifters at the 1968 Summer Olympics
People from Zlín District
Sportspeople from the Zlín Region